Su Bong (January 7, 1943—July 17, 1994) was a Soen Sa Nim in the Kwan Um School of Zen, the designated heir of Seung Sahn's lineage. Of both Korean and Chinese heritage, he was born in Kona, Hawaii. Su Bong began his practice with Seung Sahn in 1974, helping to establish many Zen groups and temples for the lineage in the years that followed. In 1981 he received inka from Seung Sahn, making him a Ji Do Poep Sa Nim (JDPSN) in the lineage and, in 1983, he was ordained a sunim and given the Buddhist name Mu Deung. He received Dharma transmission on October 11, 1992. On July 17, 1994, Su Bong died of unknown causes at a retreat while conducting kong-an interviews in Hong Kong. Today the Kwan Um School of Zen has a practice center in his name located in Hong Kong and named Su Bong Zen Monastery.

See also
Timeline of Zen Buddhism in the United States

Notes

References

Further reading

External links
Su Bong Zen Monastery

Seon Buddhist monks
Kwan Um School of Zen
1943 births
1994 deaths
American Zen Buddhists
American people of Chinese descent
American people of Korean descent
20th-century Buddhist monks